Prahlad is a 1931 Bengali film directed by Priyanath Gangopadhyay, produced by Madan Theatre Limited. It released on 29 December 1931 in Calcutta.

Cast
 Niharbala as dancer
 Kanan Devi

References

External links

1931 films
1931 drama films
Bengali-language Indian films
Indian black-and-white films
1930s Bengali-language films
Indian drama films